For other parks of the same name, see White City (amusement parks)

White City was an amusement park in New Orleans, Louisiana, functioning from 1907 to 1913. It was located in what became part of Mid-City New Orleans, only recently opened for development at the time after improvements in drainage. 

Promoter Charles C. Mathews advertised the opening of the park on 4 May 1907. In addition to amusement rides, the park offered musical performances, including opera.

After the park closed, Pelican Stadium was built at the site at Carrollton and Tulane Avenues.

References
 "New Orleans A Pictorial History" by Leonard V. Huber, 1971, Bonanza Books

Amusement parks in New Orleans
Defunct amusement parks in the United States
20th century in New Orleans
1907 establishments in Louisiana
1913 disestablishments in Louisiana